Konari may refer to:
 Konari, Deyr, Bushehr Province
 Konari, Tangestan, Bushehr Province
 Konari, Fars
 Konari, Khuzestan
 Konari, Sistan and Baluchestan

See also
 Konar (disambiguation)